Savaştepe station is a station in Savaştepe, Turkey. Located in the eastern part of the town, four daily trains, operated by TCDD Taşımacılık, stop at the station. The station was originally built by the Smyrna Cassaba Railway in 1912 and sold to the Turkish State Railways in 1934.

References

External links
Station information
Station timetable

Railway stations in Balıkesir Province
Railway stations opened in 1912
1912 establishments in the Ottoman Empire
Savaştepe District